This is a list of members of the Tasmanian House of Assembly between the 1891 election and the 1893 election.

Party affiliations were relatively loose during the period. In the table below, "Ministerial" relates to supporters of Philip Fysh, who served as Premier of Tasmania until 17 August 1892, and "Opposition" refers to a number of other groups, several of which supported Henry Dobson who became Premier after this time.

Notes
 On 25 July 1891, the election of the Ministerial member for Brighton, Thomas Dillon, was declared void under the Electoral Act 1890 following a petition by the unsuccessful candidate and incumbent member, Henry Mugliston, alleging Dillon had engaged in corrupt practices and bribery during the campaign. Henry Dobson, the Opposition candidate, won the resulting by-election on 12 August 1891.
 In August 1891, William Burgess, one of the two members for West Hobart, resigned. Edward Mulcahy won the resulting by-election on 19 August 1891.
 On 17 August 1892, following the fall of the Fysh government, Henry Dobson was invited to form a government which included three Assembly members. These members were therefore required to resign and contest ministerial by-elections. On 26 August 1892, all of them were returned unopposed.
 On 5 August 1892, Henry Lette, one of the two members for North Launceston, died. David Scott won the resulting by-election on 9 September 1892.
 On 11 January 1893, just four months into his term, David Scott, one of the two members for North Launceston, died. Alexander Fowler won the resulting by-election on 31 January 1893.
 In March 1893, Charles Featherstone, the member for Sorell, was disqualified due to bankruptcy. Joseph Woollnough won the resulting by-election on 18 April 1893.
 On 24 April 1893, Edmund Henry Sutton, the member for Cressy, died. Daniel Burke won the resulting by-election on 16 May 1893.

Sources
 
 Parliament of Tasmania (2006). The Parliament of Tasmania from 1956

Members of Tasmanian parliaments by term
19th-century Australian politicians